Šėta Eldership is a Lithuanian eldership, located in the eastern part of Kėdainiai District Municipality.

Geography
The territory of Šėta Eldership is located mostly in the Nevėžis Plain. Relief is mostly flat, cultivated as agriculture lands. 

 Rivers: Obelis, Šumera, Rudekšna, Suleva, Indija, Arvystas.
 Lakes and ponds: Sangailis Lake, Bubliai Reservoir, Kapliai Reservoir, Šėta Reservoir.
 Forests: Pauslajys Forest, Siesikai Forest, Lančiūnava-Šventybrastis Forest.
 Protected areas: Šėta Botanical Sanctuary, Ilgatrakis Forest Botanical-Zoological Sanctuary, Runeikiai Forest Telmological Sanctuary.

Places of interest
Catholic churches in Šėta and Pagiriai
Catholic chapels in Šėta and Pagiriai cemeteries
Manors sites in Pašumerys and Vaiškoniai
Sangailai and Stašaičiai hillforts
Former watermill in Pakščiai
Pašėtė burial site and shrine
Soviet mosaic the "Man and Technics" in Aukštieji Kapliai

Populated places 
Following settlements are located in the Šėta Eldership (as for the 2011 census):

Towns: Pagiriai · Šėta
Villages: Aleksandriškis · Aukštieji Kapliai · Bebrikiai · Bladikiai · Čereliai · Dargužiai · Glaušiai · Griniškiai · Gumbiai · Jaskaičiai · Jokniai · Jovaišai · Kamėnai · Kezai · Kreiviai · Kuronys · Liliūnai · Lioliai · Lyviškiai · Margiai · Mauliai · Mitėniškiai · Norbutiškiai · Pagiriai· Paguiriai · Pakščiai · Papurviai · Pašėtė · Pašumeris · Petraičiai · Plankiai · Pručiai · Rikliškiai · Runeikiai · Sangailai · Simanonys · Stageliai · Stagiai · Steponava · Trakučiai · Vaiškoniai · Valakai · Vidnapolis · Vivonys · Zapranai · Žeguniai · Žeimeliai · Žemieji Kapliai · Žilionys
 Hamlets: Bernotiškis ·Bugumilava · Čeponiškiai · Daratava · Joniškiai · Kirdeikiai · Linksmavietė · Morkūnai · Ožiškiai · Sokai 
 Former settlements: Pakšteliai · Pramislava

References

Elderships in Kėdainiai District Municipality